Del Ray (1927 – November 18, 2003) was a professional American magician.

References 

1920s births
American magicians
2003 deaths